The São Léo Open is a tennis tournament held in São Leopoldo, Brazil since 2011. The event is part of the ATP Challenger Tour and is played on outdoor clay courts.

Past finals

Singles

Doubles

References

External links
Official website

 
ATP Challenger Tour
Clay court tennis tournaments
Tennis tournaments in Brazil